These are the premier lawn bowls national championships.

Australian National Championships

British Isles Championships

English National Championships

Irish National Championships

New Zealand National Championships

Scottish National Championships

South African National Championships

Welsh National Championships

References

Bowls by country
Bowling competitions